Dr. Lo' Lo' binti Mohd Ghazali (2 August 1957 – 17 July 2011;) was a Malaysian politician. She served as the Member of Parliament for the Titiwangsa constituency in Kuala Lumpur, Malaysia from 2008 until her death in 2011. Lo' Lo' was a career physician who was elected to the central committee of the Pan-Malaysian Islamic Party (PAS) in 2001.

Education 
She was born on 2 August 1957 in Kuala Kangsar, Perak. She attended the Connolly National School, Ipoh, Perak, then Sekolah Raja Taayah, Ipoh, Perak and then Kolej Islam Kelang, Selangor. She continued her studies at Universiti Kebangsaan Malaysia majoring in medicine. She was a member of the UKM Student Leadership Council.

She then studied at Adelaide for Alternative Medicine & Surgery - Acupunturist.

She has been involved in KHIM, Malaysian Charity Foundation, Malaysian Islamic Consumers Association, PAPISMA, Allergy & Aesthetic Association, Hypertension Association, AFMY, ABIM, Al Khadeem, JIM, FPUKM Alumni Association, ALKIS Alumni and SISTA Alumni.

Family 
Her father was Dato Hj Mohd Ghazali Abdullah who was the first Imam of the National Mosque as well as the former Mufti of Perak and her mother Datin Hjh Zainab. Her husband is Professor Dr Aminuddin Abd Hamid Karim who is a medical lecturer.

She has four children: Mawaddah, Muhd Fawwaz, Sakinah and Muhd Farhan, one son-in-law; Mohd Azizy (Mawaddah's husband) and a daughter-in-law; Nur Hafizzah (Fawwaz's wife) as well as a grandson; 'Izz Nu'man (son of Mawaddah).

Career 
She served in the General Hospital of Alor Star, Kedah as a medical officer from 1983 to 1985. She served in the Great Health Center of Pokok Sena, Kedah from 1985 until 1987, Kuala Lumpur General Hospital (1987-1988), Kuala Lumpur Islamic Center of Medicine (1988 -1994) and became the medical officer and executive director of KOHILAL Medical Center, Kuala Lumpur from 1994 until the end of her life.

She has also been a PAS Board of Director of Harakah.

Politics 
In the 2008 general elections, she defeated the Barisan Nasional - UMNO candidate Datuk Aziz Jamaludin Mhd. Tahir for the Titiwangsa seat with a majority of 1,972 votes. She earned 17,857 votes compared to her opponent with only 15,885 votes. She is among the 3 PAS Muslimat candidates who have won the General Election. Her victory was the first victory for PAS in the Federal Territories after more than 30 years of PAS trying to land in Kuala Lumpur.

She previously contested for the Bukit Gantang seat in the 2004 general elections, losing to the Barisan Nasional candidate, Tan Lian Hoe.

Death 
She died on 17 July 2011 of cancer.

Election results

References

Malaysian medical doctors
Malaysian people of Malay descent
Malaysian Muslims
People from Kuala Kangsar
2011 deaths
1957 births
Malaysian Islamic Party politicians
People from Perak
Women members of the Dewan Rakyat
Women in Perak politics
Women in Kuala Lumpur politics
National University of Malaysia alumni
Deaths from cancer in Malaysia
Members of the Dewan Rakyat
21st-century Malaysian women politicians